A boulder is a large rock.  

Boulder may also refer to:

Places

Australia 
 Boulder, Western Australia
 Electoral district of Boulder

Canada 
 Boulder Island, Nunavut, Canada

United States 
 Boulder, Colorado
 Boulder, Illinois, an unincorporated community in Clinton County, Illinois
 Boulder, Montana
 Boulder, Utah
 Boulder, West Virginia, an unincorporated community in Barbour County, West Virginia
 Boulder, Wyoming
 Boulder City, Nevada
 Boulder Creek, California
 Boulder Junction, Wisconsin, a town
 Boulder Junction (CDP), Wisconsin, an unincorporated community
 Boulder Dam, a.k.a. Hoover Dam

Education

United States 
 Boulder, University of Colorado Boulder
 Boulder, Boulder High School

Other uses
 Boulder, large toy marble subject to distinct rules
 Boulder, a.k.a. Nix, orbiting Pluto
 Boulders (album), a 1973 album by Roy Wood
 Boulder, a fictional truck in the racing video game Excite Truck
 Boulder, a character from Transformers: Rescue Bots
 Boulder Amplifiers, an American high-end audio manufacturer
 Terry Boulder, early stage name for American professional wrestler Hulk Hogan
 Horace Boulder, former American professional wrestler
 Boulder (band), an American rock band

See also 
 Bouldering, sport
 Boulder River (disambiguation)
 The Boulders (disambiguation)
 Bould (surname)
 Bolder